The southern spiny pocket mouse (Heteromys australis) is a species of rodent in the family Heteromyidae. It is found in Colombia, Ecuador, and Panama.

References

Heteromys
Mammals of Colombia
Mammals of Ecuador
Rodents of Central America
Mammals described in 1901
Taxa named by Oldfield Thomas
Taxonomy articles created by Polbot